Armando Labra (May 9, 1943 – April 5, 2006) was a Mexican economist, and the technical secretary for the Planification Counsel of the UNAM.

Biography
Born in Zumpango, in the State of Mexico, he was the grandson of Frolylan Manjarrez, a congressman, and Wenceslao Labra, the ex-governor for the State of Mexico.  He studied at the National School of Economy in Mexico, and continued his studies at Berkeley.  He was a federal congressman for the State of Mexico.  He opposed neo-liberalism, and left the PRI in 1994.

Sources
La Jornada article on his death.
 

1943 births
2006 deaths
Mexican economists
People from Zumpango